The 2016 ADAC GT Masters was the tenth season of the ADAC GT Masters, the grand tourer-style sports car racing founded by the German automobile club ADAC. The season started on 25 April at Motorsport Arena Oschersleben and ended on 2 October at Hockenheim after seven double-header meetings.

Entry list

Race calendar and results

The seven-event calendar for the 2015 season was announced on 13 November 2015. It was held along with the Deutsche Tourenwagen Masters at the Lausitzring.

Championship standings
Scoring system
Championship points were awarded for the first ten positions in each race. Entries were required to complete 75% of the winning car's race distance in order to be classified and earn points. Individual drivers were required to participate for a minimum of 25 minutes in order to earn championship points in any race.

Drivers' championships

Junior class

Notes
1 – Nicolas Pohler was a guest driver at Lausitzring and therefore did not score points.

Trophy class

Teams' championship

Notes

References

External links
 

ADAC GT Masters seasons
ADAC GT Masters season